Ripley's Believe It or Not!: The Animated Series (also known simply as Ripley's Believe It or Not!) is an animated television series based solely on the brand of Ripley's Believe It or Not!. The series was produced by Alphanim and Cinar  for Family Channel and France 3. 26 episodes were produced, and were aired on Fox Family Channel beginning on July 14, 1999. The series is about three young people who discover unexplained mysteries and unusual items. It is cited as the only animated series to have ever been based on the brand.

Plot
The series follows the adventures of "Michael Ripley", Robert Ripley's nephew. The show was aimed at a younger audience, and would often feature Michael going around the world with his two friends Samantha and Cyril in search of the strange, bizarre, and unexplained. They visit strange sites, meet peculiar people, witness fantastic feats and, at the end of every episode, secure yet another awesome oddity.

Cast
Tedd Dillon as Michael Ripley
Rick Jones as Cyril Barker
Jennifer Morehouse as Samantha Seaver

Additional voices
Bonnie Mak as Suzi
Rick Miller
Sonja Ball
Robert Brewster 
Mark Camacho
Ellen David
Luis de Cespedes
Carlo Essagian
Dean Hagopian
Kim Handysides
A.J. Henderson
Neil Kroetsch 
George Morris
Tom Rack
Harry Standjofski
Jeannie Walker
Russell Yuen

Episodes
The Daruma Dolls
The Vampire Kit
The Golden Helmet of Ur
Curse of the Pharaoh's Tomb
The Lie Detector
The Million Year Old Egg
Ghost of the Mystery House
Eternity for Sale
And Now the Weather
Love's Many Charms
The Lama's Skull
Wattam the Warriors' Mask
The First Artifact
Well Doon, Cyril!
A Dragon's Lullaby
Heads I Win, Tails You Lose
A Flare for Fashion
A Helping Hand
In His Uncle's Footsteps
Can't See the Forest for the Trees
Follow Your Dreams
The Sweet Taste of Revenge
The Evil Eye
Hate Never Sleeps
Peace for a Princess

Broadcast history
The show was broadcast on France 3 in France and Family Channel, as well as Fox Family Channel in the United States, beginning on July 14, 1999. 

The show was then broadcast in reruns on This TV as part of Cookie Jar Toons from 2008 to 2009.

Home media
In 2011, Mill Creek Entertainment released 5 episodes of the show on DVD as part of their deal with Cookie Jar Group in Region 1, under the name "Do You Believe?". An episode was also included as part of Cookie Jar's Halloween Cartoon Collection.

The show used to be available on iTunes, but as of 2023, it's currently available on Vudu, Google Play, and YouTube.

References

External links

1990s Canadian animated television series
1990s Canadian children's television series
1999 Canadian television series debuts
1999 Canadian television series endings
1990s French animated television series
1999 French television series debuts
1999 French television series endings
Canadian children's animated action television series
Canadian children's animated adventure television series
French children's animated action television series
French children's animated adventure television series
Ripley's Believe It or Not! television series
Television shows based on comic strips
English-language television shows
Family Channel (Canadian TV network) original programming
Fox Family Channel original programming
Gaumont Animation
Television series about urban legends
Television series by Cookie Jar Entertainment
France Télévisions children's television series